Baranówek refers to the following places in Poland:

 Baranówek, Greater Poland Voivodeship
 Baranówek, Świętokrzyskie Voivodeship